Viktoriya Viktorovna Sudarushkina (born 2 September 1990) is a Russian track and field athlete who specialises in the javelin throw. She represented the host nation at the 2013 World Championships in Athletics in Moscow and placed seventh in the final.

She made her international debut at the 2009 European Athletics Junior Championships, coming eighth, and made her first national podium the following year. She rose into the senior ranks in 2013. This gained her selection for the 2013 World Championships in Athletics, where she was a finalist. She was the winner at the Russian Championships in 2014 and fourth at the 2014 European Team Championships, but only cleared sixty metres once that year.

She failed to translate this to later season success, with a mark of 52.19 m at the 2015 European Team Championships being a low point. She failed to throw beyond fifty metres at the 2016 Russian Championships.

She was suspended from international competition in 2016 due to an overarching ban on the All-Russia Athletic Federation as a response to state-sponsored doping.

International competitions

National titles
Russian Athletics Championships
Javelin throw: 2014

References

External links

1990 births
Living people
Russian female javelin throwers
World Athletics Championships athletes for Russia
Universiade medalists in athletics (track and field)
Universiade silver medalists for Russia
Medalists at the 2013 Summer Universiade